Cordioideae is a subfamily of the flowering plant family Boraginaceae.

Genera
 Coldenia L.
 Cordia L.
 Saccellium Humb. & Bonpl.

References

 
Asterid subfamilies